The list of ship commissionings in 1931 includes a chronological list of all ships commissioned in 1931.


See also 

1931
 Ship commissionings